Cheikh Bouamama Airport  is a military airport located near Mécheria, Naâma Province, Algeria.

Airlines and destinations

See also
List of airports in Algeria

References

External links 
 OurAirports - Mecheria
 
 

Airports in Algeria
Buildings and structures in Naâma Province